Sources of Life is a 2013 German film directed by Oskar Roehler.

Cast 
 Jürgen Vogel as Erich Freytag
 Moritz Bleibtreu as Klaus Freytag
 Kostja Ullmann as Young Klaus Freitag
 Meret Becker as Elisabeth Freytag
 Sonja Kirchberger as Marie Freytag
 Lavinia Wilson as Gisela Ellers
 Leonard Scheicher as Robert Freytag, 13–17 years
 Lisa Smit as Laura, 13–17 years
  as Hildegard Ellers
 Thomas Heinze as Martin Ellers
 Rolf Zacher as Erwin

References

External links 

2013 comedy films
2013 films
Films directed by Oskar Roehler
Films scored by Martin Todsharow
Films set in 1949
Films set in the 1950s
Films set in the 1960s
Films set in the 1970s
Films set in West Germany
German comedy films
2010s German films